is a Japanese boxer. He competed at the 1952 Summer Olympics and the 1956 Summer Olympics. At the 1952 Summer Olympics, he lost to Pedro Galasso of Brazil.

1956 Olympic results
Below is the record of Toshihito Ishimaru , a Japanese lightweight boxer who competed at the 1956 Melbourne Olympics:

 Round of 32: defeated Paddy Donovan (New Zealand) on points
 Round of 16: lost to Anatoly Lagetko (Soviet Union) on points

References

External links
 

1931 births
Living people
Japanese male boxers
Olympic boxers of Japan
Boxers at the 1952 Summer Olympics
Boxers at the 1956 Summer Olympics
Place of birth missing (living people)
Featherweight boxers